Gundlachia can refer to:

Gundlachia (gastropod)'', a genus of freshwater snails in the family Planorbidae
Gundlachia (plant), a genus of plants in the family Asteraceae